was a town located in Naga District, Wakayama Prefecture, Japan.

As of 2003, the town had an estimated population of 21,158 and a density of 940.77 persons per km². The total area was 22.49 km².

On November 11, 2005, Kishigawa, along with the towns of Kokawa, Momoyama, Naga and Uchita (all from Naga District), was merged to create the city of Kinokawa.

External links
Official town website 
Kinokawa city 

Dissolved municipalities of Wakayama Prefecture
Kinokawa, Wakayama